Inubōsaki Marine Park was a marine park opened in 1954 in Chōshi, Chiba Prefecture. It was renewed in 1993 and closed in 2018.

Overview 
It closed 31 January 2018, with the owners citing a decline in visitors after the 2011 earthquake and nuclear crisis.

After closure 

In August 2018 the closed site attracted controversy when drone camera footage of animals still left in the park, including Honey, a female bottlenose dolphin, 46 penguins, and dozens of fish and reptiles, was released on social media.  Although employees still fed and maintained the animals, several organizations are attempting to rehouse or rehabilitate these animals to be re-released back into the wild. Honey the bottlenose dolphin, died, due to a lack of maintenance and enteritus.

References

Marine parks
1954 establishments in Japan
2018 disestablishments in Japan
Tourist attractions in Chiba Prefecture
Aquaria in Japan